() is thin strips or sheets of dried meat and fish used in Korean cuisine. Po, which is made from meats including beef, pork, venison and poultry; and seafoods including  whitefish, eel, squid, octopus, shrimp and crab; is eaten as snack food, banchan (food accompanying bap) or anju (food accompanying sul). Po is prepared for traditional occasions such as pyebaek (formal greetings from the newlyweds after the wedding ceremony) and jesa (ancestral rite).

Name 
The Sino-Korean word  can be written with the hanja , which in other East Asian languages and cuisines can also mean preserved fruit.

History 
History of po is thought to date back to pre-historic hunter-gatherer societies.

According to Samguk sagi (History of the Three Kingdoms), an 1145 book written by Gim Bu-sik, in February 683 the King Sinmun of Silla sent 135 carts of rice, wine, oil, honey, jang (soy sauce, soybean paste), vinegar, and po to Gim Heum-un's house for his daughter's wedding.

Northern Song Chinese scholar Wu Ji (?–1142) described Goryeo Koreans seasoning  (dried venison) with cinnamon.

In Joseon Korea, po made in governmental offices was called  ("governmental po"). Geonpo used for jehyang was called . At Korean New Year, it was common for provincial officials to send  ("po and candles") to their relatives and officials in the central government. Beef po was also often used to make , a kind of dasik (tea food). The 18th-century book Sasojeol (Elementary Matters of Etiquette for Scholar Families), which was written by the Joseon scholar Yi Deok-mu (1741–1793), states; "Do not frequently smell fish or seafood po". ("thousand-ri po"), made from meats marinated for a day in wine, vinegar, and salt, was prepared for long journeys.

Varieties 
Meat or fish that is thinly sliced and dried is usually called , while meat that is pounded flat and dried is called . Dried fish is called  with the letter   ) meaning "fish".

Meat 

  – venison
  – Siberian roe deer venison
  – pork, salted and dried, parboiled in diluted wine, and dried again
  – beef
 By method
  – seasoned with aged soy sauce, massaged, and dried
  – thick slices of lean meat is repeatedly grilled to sear skin, beaten with bats, and seasoned with aged soy sauce, until thoroughly cooked
  – meat is pounded flat with knife, and dried
  – meat sliced into pieces and sun-dried
  – meat is thinly sliced, seasoned with soy sauce, oil, sugar, and pepper, massaged, and dried on sokuri

Poultry 
  – goose
  – wild goose
  – pheasant

Seafood 

  – squid
  – thinly sliced fish
  – fiddler crab meat
  – fish
  – shrimp, halved, marinated, dried and grilled
 Pressed
  – thread-sail filefish, dried and pressed
  – giant octopus, dried and pressed
  – squid, dried and pressed

Others 
  – snake meat, eaten as folk remedy in the past

Uses 
Po made from various meats, fish, and seafood are eaten as snack food, banchan (food accompanying bap) or anju (food accompanying sul). Crab and other seafood po are beaten, fluffled, seasoned with soy sauce and oil, and eaten as muchim. Fish po are seasoned with soy sauce or gochujang and are grilled as gui.

Po are one of the foods prepared for traditional occasions such as pyebaek (formal greetings from the newlyweds after the wedding ceremony) and jesa (ancestral rite). Po and sikhye (rice punch) used for jesa is called .

See also 
 List of meat dishes

References 

Dried foods
Korean meat dishes
Korean seafood dishes